The Men's 77 kg weightlifting event at the 2002 Commonwealth Games took place at the Manchester International Convention Centre on 1 August 2002.

Schedule
All times are Coordinated Universal Time (UTC)

Records
Prior to this competition, the existing world, Commonwealth and Games records were as follows:

Results

1 Rai originally won the bronze medal at snatch and gold medals at clean & jerk and total, but was disqualified after he tested positive for strychnine.

References

Weightlifting at the 2002 Commonwealth Games